Umphrey Lee (1893–1958) was the President of Southern Methodist University from 1939 to 1954.

Biography
Lee was born in Oakland City, Indiana on March 23, 1893, to Josephus A. and Esther (Davis) Lee. His father was a farmer and Methodist minister; both of his parents were from Kentucky.

Lee attended Daniel Baker College from 1910 to 1912, and received a B.A from Trinity University in 1914. He received his M.A. from Southern Methodist University two years later, and his PhD from Columbia University in 1931. He worked as a Methodist pastor.

In 1919, Lee established the Wesley Bible Chair at the University of Texas. In 1923, he became the pastor of Highland Park Methodist Church, on the Southern Methodist University campus, and taught homiletics. While at Highland Park Methodist Church, now Highland Park United Methodist Church Dr. Lee instituted a new mission program. Beginning in 1929 at the start of the U.S. Great Depression, Highland Park Methodist Church undertook a new missionary outreach in China, with Rev. Hubert Lafayette Sone as their “Special” representative. “During the four years that the Rev. Hubert L. Sone has been our Special we have come to regard him as much a part of the ministry of this church as our preacher in charge.”, From 1937 to 1939, he was Dean of the School of Religion at Vanderbilt University in Nashville, Tennessee. Lee then served as President of Southern Methodist University from 1939 to 1954. He was the first Chancellor of Southern Methodist University from 1954 to 1958.

Umphrey Lee was a member of the Medieval Academy of America, the American Historical Society, the American Society of Church History, and the Philosophical Society of Texas.

He died in University Park, Dallas County, Texas in 1958 at age 65. He was survived by his wife, Mary, and their son, Umphrey Lee. Several schools in Dallas have been named for him.

Bibliography
The Lord's Horseman (1928)
John Wesley and Modern Religion (1936)
Our Fathers and Us (The Heritage of the Methodists) (1958)

References

1893 births
1958 deaths
American Methodist clergy
Arminian ministers
Arminian writers
Columbia University alumni
People from Dallas
People from Oakland City, Indiana
Presidents of Southern Methodist University
Southern Methodist University alumni
Southern Methodist University faculty
Trinity University (Texas) alumni
University of Texas at Austin faculty
Vanderbilt University faculty